Oana Andreea Petrovschi (born 5 February 1986 in Bârlad, Romania) is a retired Romanian artistic gymnast. She is a silver world medalist on uneven bars and a bronze European medalist on vault. In 2002, she was elected Sportsman of the year in Hunedoara County.

References

External links
Event Finals results at the 2002 European Championships

Living people
Sportspeople from Bârlad
Romanian female artistic gymnasts
Medalists at the World Artistic Gymnastics Championships
1986 births
21st-century Romanian women